Aidan Coffey is an Irish traditional accordionist from Co. Waterford (Ireland). He recorded with Irish traditional fiddle players Seamus Creagh and Frankie Gavin and with accompanists Mick Daly, Seán Ó Loingsigh, Alec Finn and Arty McGlynn and he was a member of the traditional band De Dannan from 1988 to 1995.

Discography

Albums
The Corner House Set" Dublin to DonegalIsland to Island with Seamus CreaghHow the West was Won (De Dannan)Seamus Creagh and Aidan CoffeyThe Irish Drum (Colm Murphy)Ireland Treasures of Irish Music (Various)Irlande with Frankie Gavin and Arty McGlynnHalf Set in Harlem with De DannanJacket of Batteries with De DannanFolkworldThe SessionContributing artistThe Rough Guide to Irish Music'' (1996)

References

Irish accordionists
Living people
De Dannan members
21st-century accordionists
Year of birth missing (living people)